Savoy Songbook Vol. 1 is a compilation album from the Norwegian group of the same name, released Monday, August 6, 2007, in Norway. It was released in the UK by Genepool Records on May 12, 2008.  Disc 1 contains three all-new tracks and re-recordings of earlier tracks.  Disc 2 contains the original versions of past material, though there are two versions of "Star."  "Karma Boomerang" was released as a single in April 2007 in Norway as a download and radio cut.

Track listing

Disc One
1. Rain
2. Karma Boomerang
3. Best Western Beauty
4. Star
5. Tears From A Stone
6. Grind You Down
7. Reasons to Stay Indoors
8. Whalebone
9. Barefoot In A Denim Jacket
10. Lackluster Me

Disc Two
1. Velvet
2. Man In The Park (single edit)
3. End Of The Line
4. Star (single edit)
5. Daylight's Wasting
6. Empty Of Feeling
7. Foolish
8. Unsound
9. Fearlist
10. Bottomless Pit
11. You Won't Come To The Party
12. The Breakers
13. You Should Have Told Me
14. Face

Credits

Produced by Michael Ilbert and Savoy
Mixed by Sylvia Massy, Kale Holmes and Rich Veltrop
Mastered by George Marino

Savoy are:
Drums, backing vocals: Frode Unneland
Guitar, keyboard and vocals: Paul Waaktaar-Savoy
Rhythm-guitar and vocal by Lauren Savoy

Additional personnel:
Bass: Jørun Bøgeberg
Piano on track 7: Rob Schwimmer
Drums on track 3: Joe Mardin
Strings on tracks 1 and 10:The Vertavo Quartet
Violin/viola on track 3: Atle Sponberg/Jon Sønstebø
Pedal-steel on track 8: Geir Sundstøl
Strings on track 7 arranged by Joe Mardin
All songs written by Paul Waaktaar-Savoy and Lauren Savoy.
Produced by Savoy.

Charts

References

External links
Genepool Records

2007 compilation albums
Savoy (band) albums